Cynophalla hastata is a plant species in the genus Cynophalla.

References

External links

hastata